Pedro González Llamas was a Spanish general in the Peninsular War and one of the deputies that signed the Spanish Constitution of 1812.

Army of Spain

Following the September 1808 meeting at which the new Army of Spain was defined, and which incorporated the divisions he had brought from Valencia and Murcia, totalling some 4,500 men, including infantry and cavalry, into the Army of the Centre, Llamas headed for Tudela with his troops. Establishing his headquarters there, he was joined shortly afterwards by La Peña's 10,000 men and, on 17 October, by Castaños.

Shortly afterwards, however, on taking up a post in the Gobierno Supremo, he would hand over the command of his troops to Pedro Roca and become directly involved in the setting up the Cortes of Cádiz.

Constitution

Having initially refused to sign the Constitution, on being ordered by the Cortes of Cádiz to do so, Llamas finally signed, as deputy for the reino de Murcia.

References

Spanish generals
Spanish commanders of the Napoleonic Wars
Year of birth missing
Year of death missing